Texcoconibacillus is a genus of bacteria from the family of Bacillaceae with one known species (Texcoconibacillus texcoconensis). Texcoconibacillus texcoconensis has been isolated from the lake Texcoco in Mexico.

References

Further reading 
 

Bacillaceae
Bacteria genera
Monotypic bacteria genera